Dronningborg Boldklub is a Danish amateur football club located in Dronningborg, a suburb of Randers.

History 
Dronningborg Boldklub was founded in 1928 and was accepted to JBU in 1934. The club's first team is in the Jyllandsserie, which is the 5th ranked league in Denmark. 
In 2003 the club went into a merger, and is one of the six founding clubs of Randers FC.

Dronningborg BK's colours are yellow and blue. Dronningborg BK plays their home matches on Dronningborg Stadion.

References

External links 
 Dronningborg BK – official site

Football clubs in Denmark
Association football clubs established in 1928
1928 establishments in Denmark
Randers